On 17 July 2022, three dead bodies were found at a tiny isolated Aboriginal community known as an outstation, located  north of Alice Springs, in the Northern Territory of Australia. A firearm was found at the scene. Northern Territory Police investigated the incident as domestic violence.

Background 
The Northern Territory has some of the highest rates of domestic and family violence in Australia. Domestic violence-related murders are six times more likely to occur in the Northern Territory than elsewhere in the country, with Aboriginal women in Central Australia estimated to be 60 times more likely to be victims.

The female victim identified in the murder-suicide was later identified simply as A.K. Her partner and child were the male and infant victims, respectively. A.K.'s partner had a history of domestic violence. Earlier in the year, he was given a nine-month suspended sentence while in trial at the Northern Territory Supreme Court after unlawfully causing harm to a previous partner. According to one of the sisters of A.K., the male victim was physically violent to her and showed signs of coercive control, and after an incident revolving around physical violence, authorities were called and failed to arrive.

Incident 
On 17 July 2022, police found the bodies of a 41-year old man, a 30-year old woman and a 14-week old infant after receiving a report at 2:30 pm. A firearm was located at the scene, which was in the possession of the male victim.

Aftermath 
A week after the deaths, a vigil was held at Alice Springs with around 100 people attending the event.

A.K.'s two surviving young children were taken in by A.K.'s younger sister, Michelle.

The Northern Territory Police were criticised for their reaction to the incident. The limited amount of information released by them was noted by multiple people, including A.K's family. The fact that the deaths could have been prevented if police had taken action after previous violent incidents was also noted by several people. The lack of national attention towards the deaths was also criticised for not making more people aware of the lack of action taken toward family violence.

References 

Murder–suicides in Australia
Crime in the Northern Territory
2022 murders in Australia
2020s in the Northern Territory